"(Where Do I Begin?) Love Story" is a popular song published in 1970, with music by Francis Lai and lyrics by Carl Sigman. The song was first introduced as an instrumental theme in the 1970 film Love Story after the film's distributor, Paramount Pictures, rejected the first set of lyrics that were written. Andy Williams eventually recorded the new lyrics and took the song to number nine on Billboard magazine's Hot 100 and number one on their Easy Listening chart.

History

The score for Love Story was written by Francis Lai, and the company that published the music for Paramount felt that the track heard over the opening and closing credits, which was titled "Theme from Love Story", needed lyrics. Michael Sigman, son of lyricist Carl Sigman, recalled that his father was asked to provide the words and received "a synopsis of the script and the lead sheet of the music. The story was schmaltzy, but the music inspired words that expressed the sadness beneath the schmaltz." The initial set of lyrics his father wrote mirrored the storyline of the film from the perspective of the male protagonist, who describes a woman who enters his life ("So Jenny came") and then "suddenly was gone." Paramount executive Robert Evans "thought the lyric was a 'downer.' Further, he couldn't abide the phrase 'Jenny came,' believing it too sexually suggestive for a mainstream audience. He demanded a rewrite," and this upset Carl. "At first, justifiably proud of the fine lyric he crafted, he was angry and felt like refusing to do a rewrite. But the next day he cooled off and, pacing around his living room, said to his wife, 'Where do I begin?' and the new lyric was launched."

The recording of "Theme from Love Story" by Henry Mancini was released as a single and made its debut on Billboard'''s Easy Listening chart in the issue of the magazine dated December 19. Two versions of "(Where Do I Begin?) Love Story"—one by Williams and one by Tony Bennett—were released on January 15, 1971, and an article in the magazine's January 23 issue tried to explain the gap between releases of the instrumental and vocal versions as intentional. The logic behind the decision was that "only the instrumental version should hit the market before the picture's release, and that the vocal version should be held up until several weeks after the film's release so that 'the theme and the image of Love Story would be implanted in the audience's mind.'"

Chart success

The Mancini version spent two of its 16 weeks on the Easy Listening chart at number two and also began a run of 11 weeks on the Billboard Hot 100 in the January 16 issue, during which time it got as high as number 13. The track that Francis Lai and his orchestra recorded for the film first charted on the Hot 100 in the January 31 issue and made it to number 31 over the course of nine weeks. It reached number 21 on the Easy Listening chart during its five weeks there that began in the February 6 issue.

The Williams version of "(Where Do I Begin?) Love Story" also debuted in the February 6 issue on both the Hot 100 and Easy Listening charts, while the Bennett version only managed to "bubble under" the Hot 100 for five weeks that began in the February 13 issue and eked out a peak position at number 114. Williams reached number nine on the Hot 100 during a 13-week stay and enjoyed four of his 15 weeks on the Easy Listening chart at number one. Roy Clark entered the Country singles chart with his rendition six weeks later, on March 27, and made it to number 74 during his two weeks there. (The flip side of Clark's single was his guitar rendition of the "Theme from Love Story"
that also appeared on his 1973 album Superpicker.)

In the UK Williams began a run of 18 weeks on March 20 leading to a number four showing. His competition on the UK singles chart came from Shirley Bassey, who debuted her rendition of the song on March 27 and made it to number 34 during a nine week run.

A pop version of "(Where Do I Begin?) Love Story" by Nino Tempo & April Stevens went by the title "Love Story" and "bubbled under" the Hot 100 to number 113 during its three weeks on the chart in December 1972.

Chart statistics

"Theme from Love Story"
Mancini version

Lai version

"(Where Do I Begin?) Love Story"
Williams version

Bennett version

Bassey version

Clark version

Tempo & Stevens version

Notable cover versions
The song has been covered by many artists, including as an instrumental theme. The most notable are the versions by Andy Williams and Tony Bennett. In his AllMusic review of the 1971 Johnny Mathis album Love Story'', Joe Viglione wrote, "His rendition of '(Where Do I Begin) Love Story' is riveting, a sweeping and majestic piece to lead off the record, and not the usual Jack Gold musical movement, but more pronounced and determined."

See also
List of number-one adult contemporary singles of 1971 (U.S.)

References

Bibliography

1970 songs
Andy Williams songs
Glen Campbell songs
Film theme songs
Songs written for films
Shirley Bassey songs
Songs with music by Francis Lai
Songs written by Carl Sigman
Columbia Records singles
Song recordings produced by Dick Glasser